Ithaca most commonly refers to:

Homer's Ithaca, an island featured in Homer's Odyssey
Ithaca (island), an island in Greece, possibly Homer's Ithaca
Ithaca, New York, a city, and home of Cornell University and Ithaca College

Ithaca, Ithaka or Ithica may also refer to:

Places

Australia
Ithaca, Queensland, a neighbourhood in Brisbane
Ithaca Division, a former local government area
Shire of Ithaca, a former local government area
Town of Ithaca, a former local government area
Ithaca Creek, a creek in Brisbane
Ithaca Creek State School, Bardon, Brisbane

Greece
 Ithaca (regional unit), the 2nd level administrative division
 Ithaca (polis), an ancient city

United States
Ithaca, Georgia, a place in Georgia
Ithaca, Michigan
Ithaca, Nebraska
Ithaca (town), New York, a town in Tompkins County
Ithaca Pottery Site, an archaeological site in New York
Ithaca, Ohio
Ithaca, Wisconsin, a town
Ithaca (community), Wisconsin, in the town

Education
Ithaca High School (Michigan)
Ithaca City School District, New York
Ithaca High School (Ithaca, New York)
Ithaca College, New York

Literature
Ithaka (play), a 1996 play by Botho Strauss
"Ithaca" (Ulysses episode), an episode in James Joyce's novel Ulysses
Ithaca (poem), a poem by Constantine P. Cavafy
Ithaca, California, the setting for William Saroyan's novel The Human Comedy
Ithaca, a no-ship in the Dune fictional universe
Ithaka, a young-adult novel by Adèle Geras

Film
Ithaca (film), a 2015 American film
Project Ithaca, a 2019 sci-fi film by Anthony Artibello and Kevin C. Bjerkness
Ithaka (film), a 2021 Australian documentary film about the campaign to free Julian Assange

Music
Ithaca (Paula Cole album), 2010
Ithaca (Barry Guy, Marilyn Crispell, and Paul Lytton album), 2004
"Ithaca", a song by Peter Mulvey from Glencree, 1999

Transportation
 Ithaca Bus Station, a former bus terminal in Ithaca, New York
 Ithaca Central Railroad, a shortline railroad
 Ithaca station (Lehigh Valley Railroad), a former railroad station
 Ithaca Tompkins International Airport (ITH)

People
Ithaka (artist), American musician, writer, and artist
Ithaka Maria (born 1979), Estonian singer and songwriter
Craig Horner (born 1983), Australian actor and musician who has recorded as Ithaca

Other uses
Ithaka Harbors, publisher of academic journals in JSTOR
1151 Ithaka, an asteroid
Ithaca Chasma, a valley on Saturn's moon Tethys
Ithaca Gun Company, a US shotgun and rifle manufacturer 
Ithaca Intersystems, a defunct microcomputer manufacturer
SS Ithaka, a shipwreck near the port of Churchill, Manitoba, in Hudson's Bay

See also